Pogonomyrmex subdentatus is a species of ant in the family Formicidae.

References

Further reading

 
 
 
 
 

subdentatus
Insects described in 1870